Madurai District was one of the districts of the Madras Presidency of British India. It covered the present-day districts of Madurai, Dindigul, Theni, Ramanathapuram, Sivagangai and parts of Virudhunagar District in the Indian state of Tamil Nadu.

History 

Madura is a  district were the centre of the Pandya kingdom and its capital city of Madurai was flourishing ever since the Sangam period. In the 10th century AD, the region was conquered by the rising Chola power. The Pandyas governed as subordinate from the 10th to the 13th century AD when they asserted their independence and established their supremacy over the declining Cholas. After a short and progressive rule, the Pandyas were defeated by the Delhi Sultanate whose ruled Alauddin Khalji sacked Madura. The region was ruled by the Madurai Sultanate for some time before it was conquered by the Vijayanagar Empire. The Vijayanagar kings were succeeded by the Madurai Nayak kingdom whose demise in 1736 left behind a huge void. After a short period of anarchy, Madura was conquered by the British East India Company and the district of Madura was carved out.

Taluks 

Madurai district was sub-divided into 15 taluks, including 5 zamindari taluks of Ramnad estate and 3 zamindari taluks of Sivaganga estate.

 Dindigul (Headquarters: Dindigul)
 Kodaikanal
 Madurai (Headquarters: Madura)
 Melur (Headquarters: Melur)
 Mudukulathur (Part of Ramnad estate)
 Palani
 Paramakudi (Part of Ramnad estate)
 Periyakulam (Headquarters: Periyakulam)
 Ramnad (Part of Ramnad estate)
 Sivaganga (Part of Sivaganga estate)
  Tiruchuli (Part of Ramnad estate)
 Tirumangalam (Headquarters: Tirumangalam)
 Tirupattur (Part of Sivaganga estate)
 Tiruppuvanam (Part of Sivaganga estate)
 Tiruvadanai (Part of Ramnad estate) .

Administration

As of 1901, for the purposes of administration, Madurai district was divided into four sub-divisions, Madura and Melur sub-divisions being assigned to one Deputy Collector each:

 Dindigul sub-division: Dindigul, Kodaikanal, Palni and Periyakulam taluks.
 Ramnad sub-division: Ramnad estate and Sivaganga estate.
 Madura sub-division: Madura and Tirumangalam taluks.
 Melur sub-division: Melur taluk.

Sources 

 

Districts of the Madras Presidency